Everything Is F*cked: A Book About Hope is the third book by blogger and author Mark Manson published in 2019. It followed previous self-help books from Mark Manson, including The Subtle Art of Not Giving a F*ck bestseller. It was a bestseller as well, debuting at number one on the New York Times Bestseller List for Advice, How-to, and Miscellaneous.

Contents 
The book has nine chapters:

 The Uncomfortable Truth
 Self-Control Is an Illusion
 Newton's Laws of Emotion
 How to Make All Your Dreams Come True
 Hope Is Fucked
 The Formula of Humanity
 Pain Is the Universal Constant
 The Feelings Economy
 The Final Religion

References 

Self-help books
2019 non-fiction books
English-language books
HarperCollins books